The 2018 season is Chiangrai United Football Club's 10th existence. It is the 3rd season in the Thai League and the club's 8th consecutive season in the top flight of the Thai football league system since promoted in the 2011 season.

League by seasons

Competitions

Thailand Champions Cup

The 2018 Thailand Champions Cup. It features Buriram United the winners of the 2017 Thai League and Chiangrai United the winners of the 2017 Thai FA Cup. It features at Supachalasai Stadium.

Thai League

Thai FA Cup

Thai League Cup

AFC Champions League

Qualifying play-offs

References

External links
 Thai League official website
 Club's official Facebook page
 Club's info from Thai League official website

Chiangrai United F.C. seasons
Association football in Thailand lists
CRU